KBAR (1230 AM) is a radio station broadcasting a News Talk Information format. Located in Burley, Idaho, United States, the station serves the Twin Falls area.  The station is licensed to Eagle Rock Broadcasting Co Inc, which is owned by Lee Family Broadcasting.

References

External links

News and talk radio stations in the United States
BAR
Radio stations established in 1946